"When I Looked at Him" is a song recorded by American Latin freestyle vocal group Exposé for their second studio album What You Don't Know (1989). It was released on August 19, 1989 as the second single from the album. It was written and produced by the group's founder, Lewis Martineé and lead vocals on the track were sung by Jeanette Jurado.

Background
The song is a pensive ballad closer in form and structure to the group's number-one hit "Seasons Change" than to many of their more dance-oriented songs. Still, an extended "Suave Mix" appeared on the CD version of What You Don't Know, and an acoustic version of this mix was included as the B-side to the single.

Chart performance
Released as the follow-up single to "What You Don't Know", "When I Looked at Him" became Exposé's sixth consecutive top-ten single on the US Billboard Hot 100, peaking at number ten in October 1989. The single also reached number three on the Billboard Adult Contemporary chart.

Track listing

U.S. 7" (vinyl and cassette)

A - "When I Looked at Him" (4:17)
B - "When I Looked at Him" Suave Mix acoustic version (5:19)

Tracks

Charts

Weekly charts

Year-end charts

References

External links
U.S. 7" single info from discogs.com

1989 singles
Exposé (group) songs
Pop ballads
Songs written by Lewis Martineé
Arista Records singles
1989 songs